Gwayi River is a river in Zimbabwe. It is located in Matabeleland.

Rivers of Zimbabwe
Tributaries of the Zambezi River